Kae Yukawa, known professionally as Kae Alexander, is a Japanese-born British actress. She gained prominence through her role as Jing Hua in Bad Education and its spinoff film. She played Leaf in the sixth season of Game of Thrones, Linh Xuan Huy in the BBC Two drama Collateral, and Min Farshaw in the Amazon Prime series The Wheel of Time.

She appeared on the Evening Standard's 2017 list of Rising Stars.

Early life and education
Alexander was born in Kobe. She is of Japanese and Chinese descent. She spent some of her childhood in Tokyo and lived in Hong Kong for two years before moving to London with her mother Kinu, a chef and culinary teacher, at 10 years old. She has a sister and a brother.

Alexander was interested in dance as a teenager and participated in Pineapple Studios classes. She developed an interest in acting through an open house at the BRIT School her friend took her to. She went on to graduate with a Bachelor of Arts from the Guildhall School of Music and Drama in 2011.

Filmography

Films

Television

Video games

Stage

References

External links 

 

Living people
1985 births
21st-century British actresses
21st-century Hong Kong actresses
21st-century Japanese actresses
Actors from Kobe
Actresses from London
Actresses from Tokyo
Alumni of the Guildhall School of Music and Drama
British actresses of Chinese descent
British actresses of Japanese descent
Japanese emigrants to the United Kingdom
People from Kobe